Cuelenaere is a surname. Notable people with the surname include:

John Marcel Cuelenaere (1910–1967), Canadian lawyer and politician
Philippe Cuelenaere (born 1971), Belgian Olympic rower